The Ruakokoputuna River is a river of the Wairarapa, in the Wellington Region of New Zealand's North Island. The river's upper section flow through the Patuna Chasm, a narrow slot canyon.

See also
List of rivers of New Zealand

References

Rivers of the Wellington Region
Rivers of New Zealand